Kim Alsop (born c. 1933) is a former American football coach. In 1984, he was hired to restart the football program at Samford University, which had been dormant since the end of the 1973 season. In his three season with the team, Samford compiled a 6–21 record.  He was dismissed after his third season and replaced by Terry Bowden. Following Samford, Alsop accepted a position as strength and conditioning coach with at Louisiana Tech University under head coach Carl Torbush.  

Alsop was hired as the head football coach at Jackson Academy, an independent school in Jackson, Mississippi, in 1989.  After the 1993 season when Jackson Academy missed the playoffs, Alsop left coaching. He was replaced by Sherard Shaw.

Head coaching record

College

References

1930s births
Living people
Year of birth uncertain

American football quarterbacks
American strength and conditioning coaches
Louisiana Tech Bulldogs football coaches
Richmond Spiders football coaches
Samford Bulldogs football coaches
West Chester Golden Rams football players
High school football coaches in Florida
People from Westfield, New Jersey
Players of American football from New Jersey